Small Worlds was the title of a presentation given by Raph Koster at the Game Developers Conference in 2003, which was instrumental in defining and justifying many of the conventions used in MMORPG games.

Some of the conclusions reached by the presentation were:

  When a new player joins a game, it is important that they should be able to make a large number of weaker acquaintances rather than strong friendships.  The reason for this is that strong friendships tend to create social clusters (if you have strong friendships with two people, there's a good chance they both know each other too), limiting the range of social experience that can be had among those people; weaker acquaintances tend to connect clusters together and offer a wider range of experiences.  (Koster backed this up with a study showing that in the real world, most people who find a job through a friend find it through a weaker acquaintance.)
  Competition ladders should not be displayed publicly, since this would enable a competitor to offer incentives to the high-ranked players to join their game.  Since they are likely to be the centre of social clusters, this will significantly damage the social networks on the original game.
  Online skill-based games will never achieve significant interest, as a result of the Pareto principle.  The few people in the top 20% of skill will dominate everyone else, tilting the results of matches.  If players are able to team up, then people will gravitate towards the teams that contain the most of those top 20% of players, thus making these teams larger and giving them an even bigger game advantage.
  Grinds are an essential part of game design because they offer fair access to game power to all players.  Although the Pareto principle will still apply, any player can have the capacity to reach the 20% of players who have spent most time on the game, which they could not do for (for instance) the 20% of players with fastest reactions.

External links
 Koster's original slides.

Massively multiplayer online role-playing games